The recorded history of Lahore, the second largest city-district of Pakistan, covers thousands of years. Lahore is regarded as the post medieval or modern day capital and largest city of the Punjab region, it has since its creation changed hands from Hindu, Buddhist, Greek, Muslim, Mughal, Afghan, Maratha, Sikh and the British, thereby becoming the cultural capital and the heart of modern-day Pakistan.

Ancient era 

According to oral traditions, Lahore was named after Lava, son of the Hindu god Rama, who supposedly founded the city. Lahore Fort has a vacant temple dedicated in honour of Lava. Likewise, the Ravi River that flows through northern Lahore was said to be named in honour of the Hindu goddess Durga.

Ptolemy, the celebrated astronomer and geographer, mentions in his Geographia a city called Labokla situated on the route between the Indus river in a region described as extending along the rivers Bidastes or Vitasta (Jhelum), Sandabal or Chandra Bhaga (Chenab), and Adris or Iravati (Ravi).

The oldest authentic document about Lahore was written anonymously in 982 and is called Hudud-i-Alam. It was translated into English by Vladimir Fedorovich Minorsky and published in Lahore in 1927. In this document, Lahore is referred to as a small shahr (city) with "impressive temples, large markets and huge orchards." It refers to "two major markets around which dwellings exist," and it also mentions "the mud walls that enclose these two dwellings to make it one." The original document is currently held in the British Museum.

Jain Heritage

Plutarch as well as many other scholars suggest that Jainism was the most ancient and original religion in Punjab. Lahore was the cultural centre of Jainism. A book written by Plutarch, Life of Alexander talks about the encounters between Alexander the Great and digambara Jain saints called gymnosophists. Bhabra or Bhabhra is an ancient merchant community from Punjab region which mainly follows Jainism. It is believed to be connected with the Bhavadar or Bhavada Gachchha to which the Jain Acharya Kalakacharya belonged to. They may have originated from the Bhabra town (32° 13' 30": 73° 13'). Inscriptions suggest that Bhavada Gachchha had survived until the 17th century. There were Jain temples at localities still called Thari Bhabrian and Gali Bhabrian.

Hindu heritage 

Around 580 BC., when King Bimbisara ruled South Asia, the society came to be divided into different communities based on their occupation. One of their communities was called Kshatriyas and King Luv's descendants were classed with them and came to be known as Luvanam, which was also referred to as Luvana. The Luvanas from Loharghat became known as Loharana (masters of swords; or iron ("Loha") chiefs ("Rana")), which later became Lohana.

Chinese traveller Faxian, who visited South Asia between 337 and 472 CE, calls Lohana a brave community ruling the northwest territory of South Asia, in his diary. Another Chinese traveler, Kurmang who came in the eleventh century A.D. speaks of a Lohrana kingdom as a mighty power. Historian Burton writes Lohanas were brave people and says they were spread over today's Baluchistan (Pakistan), Afghanistan and eastern fringes of Central Asia. Col. Todd, who delved into history of Rajasthan, describes Lohanas as one of the oldest Kshatriya community.

The old Hindu city 

Many historians agree that Lahore was founded by an ancient Hindu colony sometime between the first and seventh centuries, probably as early as the beginning of the second; that it soon rose to be a place of importance, the parent of other colonies, and eventually the capital of a powerful principality, to which it gave its name. There are some grounds supporting that the old Hindu city of Lahore did not occupy exactly the site of the modern city. Tradition points the site of old Lahore to the vicinity of Ichhra – which is now a part of Lahore City – but was back then a village about three miles to the west.

The name of the village was formerly Icchra Lahore. Moreover, some of the oldest and most sacred Hindu shrines are found within this locality, namely Bhairo ka sthain and the Chandrat. The gate of the present city, known as the Lahori or Lohari Gate was so called as being the gateway looking in the direction of Lohawar or old Lahore just as the Kashmiri Gate looks towards Kashmir, and the Delhi Gate of modern Delhi to the ancient city of that name.

There are no architectural remains of the old Hindu city of Lahore, a circumstance which might well be explained by the absence of stone material, and the numerous destructive invasions to which the city has been subjected. But also, in accordance with what all Indian architectural researchers tend to show namely, that the northern Hindus were not, until a comparatively late period, in the habit of building temples, or durable edifices of any kind. Even at Delhi, the seat of Hindu dynasties from upwards of a thousand years before CE to more than a thousand years after CE, and there, where is abundance of stone, no specimens of Hindu architecture exist dating earlier than the tenth or eleventh century.

Medieval era

In 682 AD, according to Ferishta, the Afghans of Peshawar, who had, even at that early period, embraced Islam, wrested certain possessions from the Hindu prince. A war ensued, and in the space seventy battles were fought with varied success, until the Afghans, having formed an alliance with the Ghakkars, a wild tribe inhabiting the Salt Range of Punjab, compelled the Raja to cede a portion of his territory. The next mention of Lahore is in the Rajputana chronicles, where the Bussas of Lahore, a Rajput tribe, are mentioned as rallying to the defence of Chittore, when besieged by Muslim forces in the beginning of the ninth century.

Ghaznavid Empire

At length, in 975 AD, Sultan Sabuktigin, Governor of Khorassan and father of the celebrated Sultan Mahmud Ghaznavi advanced beyond the Indus. He was met by Raja Jayapala, the Raja of Lahore whose dominion is said to have extended from Sirhind to Laghman and from Kashmir to Multan. By the advice of the Bhati Rajput tribe, the Raja Jayapala formed an alliance with the Afghans, and, with their aid, was enabled to withstand the first invasion. However, Sabuktigin later repeated his conquest on his succession to the throne of Ghazni. A battle ensued in the vicinity of Lamghan ending with the defeat of the Raja and overtures being made for peace. His terms were accepted and persons were sent, on the part of Sabuktigin, to take the balance of the stipulated ransom. On reaching Lahore, Jayapala proved faithless and imprisoned those commissioned to receive the treasure. On learning intelligence of his perfidy, Sabuktigin, in the words of the Ferishta, "like a foaming torrent, hastened towards Hindustan".

Another battles ensued, in which Jaipal was again vanquished, and he retreated, leaving the territory to the west of the Nilab or Indus in the hands of the invader. The invader did not retain the conquests that he had made for in 1008 AD, a confederation headed by Anandapala, the son of Raja Jayapala, again met the advancing army, now commanded by Mahmud, son and successor of Sabaktagin, in the vicinity of Peshawar. Lahore was allowed to remain intact for thirteen years longer. Anandapala was succeeded by Nardjanpal, while Mahmud pushed his conquests into Hindustan. But in 1022 AD, he suddenly marched down from Kashmir, seized Lahore without opposition, and gave it over to be plundered. Nardjanpal fled helpless to Ajmer, and the Hindu principality of Lahore was extinguished forever. A final effort was made by the Hindus in the reign of Modud, 1045 AD, to recover their lost sovereignty, but after a fruitless siege of six months, they retired without success.

Few references to Lahore exist for times before its capture by Sultan Mahmud Ghaznavi in the eleventh century. In 1021, Mahmud appointed Malik Ayaz to the throne and made Lahore the capital of the Ghaznavid Empire.

The Sultan Mahmud Ghaznavi took Lahore after a long siege and battle in which the city was torched and depopulated. As the first Muslim ruler of Lahore, Ayaz rebuilt and repopulated the city. The present Lahore Fort stands in the same location. Under his rule, the city became a cultural and academic center, renowned for poetry. The tomb of Malik Ayaz can still be seen in the Rang Mahal commercial area of town.

Lahore was formally made the eastern capital of the Ghaznavid empire in 1152, under the reign of Khusrau Shah. The city then became the sole capital of the Ghaznavid empire in 1163 after the fall of Ghazni. The entire city of Lahore during the medieval Ghaznavid era was probably located west of the modern Shah Alami Bazaar, and north of the Bhatti Gate.

After the fall of the Ghaznavid Empire, Lahore was ruled by various Muslim dynasties known as the Delhi Sultanate, including the Khaljis, Tughlaqs, Sayyid, Lodhis and Suris. When Sultan Qutb-ud-din Aybak was crowned here in 1206, he became the first Muslim Sultan of South Asia. It was not until 1524 that Lahore became part of the Mughal Empire.

Mamluk 
In 1187, the Ghurids invaded Lahore, ending Ghaznavid rule over Lahore. Lahore was made capital of the Mamluk Dynasty of the Delhi Sultanate following the assassination of Muhammad of Ghor in 1206. Under the reign of Mamluk sultan Qutbu l-Din Aibak, Lahore attracted poets and scholars from as far away as Turkestan, Greater Khorasan, Persia, and Mesopotamia. Lahore at this time had more poets writing in Persian than any city in Persia or Khorasan.

Following the death of Aibak, Lahore came to be disputed among Ghurid officers. The city first came under control of the Governor of Multan, Nasir ad-Din Qabacha, before being briefly captured by the sultan of the Mamluks in Delhi, Iltutmish, in 1217.

In an alliance with local Khokhars in 1223, Jalal ad-Din Mingburnu of the Khwarazmian dynasty of modern-day Uzbekistan captured Lahore after fleeing Genghis Khan's invasion of Khwarazm. Jalal ad-Din's then fled from Lahore to capture the city of Uch Sharif after Iltutmish's armies re-captured Lahore in 1228.

The threat of Mongol invasions and political instability in Lahore caused future Sultans to regard Delhi as a safer capital for medieval Islamic India, though Delhi had before been considered a forward base, while Lahore had been widely considered to be the centre of Islamic culture in the subcontinent.

Lahore came under progressively weaker central rule under Iltutmish's descendants in Delhi - to the point that governors in the city acted with great autonomy. Under the rule of Kabir Khan Ayaz, Lahore was virtually independent from the Delhi Sultanate. Lahore was sacked and ruined by the Mongol army in 1241. Lahore governor Malik Ikhtyaruddin Qaraqash fled the Mongols, while the Mongols held the city for a few years under the rule of the Mongol chief Toghrul.

In 1266, Sultan Balban reconquered Lahore, but in 1287 under the Mongol ruler Temür Khan, the Mongols again overran northern Punjab. Because of Mongol invasions, Lahore region had become a city on a frontier, with the region's administrative centre shifted south to Dipalpur. The Mongols again invaded northern Punjab in 1298, though their advance was eventually stopped by Ulugh Khan, brother of Sultan Alauddin Khalji of Delhi. The Mongols again attacked Lahore in 1305.

Mongol invasion and destruction 

The Mongols invaded and conquered the Khwarazmian dynasty, the King Jalal ad-Din Mingburnu retreated to modern Khyber Pakhtunkhwa but was defeated in Battle of Indus.

The Mongol army advanced and in 1241, the ancient city of Lahore was invaded by 30,000-man cavalry. The Mongols defeated the Lahore governor Malik Ikhtyaruddin Qaraqash, massacred the entire population and the city was leveled to the ground. There are no buildings or monuments in Lahore that predates the Mongol destruction. In 1266, Sultan Balban reconquered Lahore from the Mongols but in 1296 to 1305 the Mongols again overran northern Punjab. In 1298, 200,000 men Mongol army conquered Punjab and committed atrocities then marched towards Delhi but was defeated by Malik Kafur general of Sultan Alauddin Khalji ruler of the Delhi Sultanate.

Tughluq
Lahore briefly flourished again under the reign of Ghazi Malik of the Tughluq dynasty between 1320 and 1325, though the city was again sacked in 1329, by Tarmashirin of the Central Asian Chagatai Khanate, and then again by the Mongol chief Hülechü. Khokhars seized Lahore in 1342, but the city was retaken by Ghazi Malik's son, Muhammad bin Tughluq. The weakened city then fell into obscurity, and was captured once more by the Khokhars in 1394. By the time Tamerlane captured the city in 1398 from Shayka Khokhar, he did not loot it because it was no longer wealthy.

Fall of the Sultanate 

Timur gave control of the Lahore region to Khizr Khan, Governor of Multan, who later established the Sayyid dynasty in 1414 – the fourth dynasty of the Delhi Sultanate. Lahore was briefly occupied by the Timurid Governor of Kabul in 1432-33. Lahore began to be incurred upon yet again the Khokhar tribe, and so the city was granted to Bahlul Lodi in 1441 by the Sayyid dynasty in Delhi, though Lodi would then displace the Sayyids in 1451 by establishing himself upon the throne of Delhi.

Bahlul Lodi installed his cousin, Tatar Khan, to be governor of the city, though Tatar Khan died in battle with Sikandar Lodi in 1485. Governorship of Lahore was transferred by Sikandar Lodi to Umar Khan Sarwani, who quickly left management of this city to his son Said Khan Sarwani.  Said Khan was removed from power in 1500 by Sikandar Lodi, and Lahore came under the governorship of Daulat Khan Lodi, son of Tatar Khan and former employer of Guru Nanak – founder of the Sikh faith.
The last Lodi ruler, Sultan Ibrahim Lodi was greatly disliked by his court and subjects. Upon the death of his father Sultan Sikandar Lodi, he quashed a brief rebellion led by some of his nobles who wanted his younger brother Jalal Khan to be the Sultan. After seizing the throne by having Jalal Khan murdered, he never really did succeed in pacifying his nobles. Subsequently, Daulat Khan, the governor of Punjab and Alam Khan, his uncle, sent an invitation to Babur, the ruler of Kabul to invade Delhi.

The first Battle of Panipat (April 1526) was fought between the forces of Babur and the Delhi Sultanate. Ibrahim Lodi was killed on the battlefield. By way of superior generalship, vast experience in warfare, effective strategy, and appropriate use of artillery, Babur won the First battle of Panipat and subsequently occupied Agra and Delhi.

Early Modern era

Mughal Empire 

Lahore reached a peak of architectural glory during the rule of the Mughals, whose buildings and gardens survived the hazards of time. Lahore's reputation for beauty fascinated the English poet John Milton, who wrote "Agra and Lahore, the Seat of Great Mughal" in 1670.

From 1524 to 1752, Lahore was part of the Mughal Empire. Lahore touched the zenith of its glory during the Mughal rule from 1524 to 1752. The Mughals, who were famous as builders, gave Lahore some of its finest architectural monuments, many of which are extant today.

From 1524 to 1752, Lahore was part of the Mughal Empire. Lahore grew under emperor Babur; from 1584 to 1598, under the emperors Akbar the Great and Jahangir, the city served as the empire's capital. Lahore reached the peak of its architectural glory during the rule of the Mughals, many of whose buildings and gardens have survived the ravages of time. Lahore's reputation for beauty fascinated the English poet John Milton, who wrote "Agra and Lahore, the Seat of the Great Mughal" in 1670. During this time, the massive Lahore Fort was built. A few buildings within the fort were added by Akbar's son, Mughal Emperor Jahangir, who is buried in the city. Jahangir's son, Shahjahan Burki, was born in Lahore. He, like his father, extended the Lahore Fort and built many other structures in the city, including the Shalimar Gardens. The last of the great Mughals, Aurangzeb, who ruled from 1658 to 1707, built the city's most famous monuments, the Badshahi Masjid and the Alamgiri Gate next to the Lahore Fort.

During the 18th century, as Mughal power dwindled, Lahore was often invaded, and government authority was lacking. The great Punjabi poet Baba Waris Shah said of the situation, "khada peeta wahy da, baqi Ahmad Shahy da" — "we have nothing with us except what we eat and wear, all other things are for Ahmad Shah". Ahmad Shah Durrani captured remnants of the Mughal Empire and had consolidated control over the Punjab and Kashmir regions by 1761.

The Delhi Sultanate and later Mughal Empire ruled the region. The Lahore region became predominantly Muslim. Due to missionary Sufi saints whose dargahs dot the landscape of Punjab region, and to the efforts of Mughal emperors, whose policies and forced religious conversions discouraged the growth of other religions.

The 1740s were years of chaos, and the city had nine different governors between 1745 and 1756.

Maratha Empire 

Shortly after defeating the Afghans in the Battle of Delhi, the Marathas entered Lahore in 1758.

In March 1758, about 50,000 soldiers of the Maratha Empire laid siege to Sirhind, with a usual alliance with Khalsa and Mughal Commander Khan Adina Beg. At that time, the Afghan general Jahan Khan, along with Abdali's son Taimur Shah, had 25,000 troops with him. On 20 April 1758, the Marathas entered Lahore.

In 1759, the Maratha and its allied forces defeated the Durrani Empire in the Battle of Lahore. The Maratha Empire had made large successes, capturing Delhi, Punjab, Kashmir, Multan, Peshawar and Attock. Adina Beg Khan appointed governor of Lahore

Sikhs Misls 
After Defeating Durrani Empire In Battle of Gujranwala (1761), Battle of Sialkot, In 1761, The Sikhs gained enough confidence to capture Lahore after back to back victories. The Sikhs besieged Lahore, Khawaja obed did not oppose the Sikh attack, Sikhs entered the Lahore city, plundered the city, captured the Royal mint and struck coins bearing Sikka Zad dar Jahan Bafazat-i-Akal, mulk-i-Ahmad garift Jassa Kalal, which means 'the coin struck by Grace of God in the country of Ahmad captured by Jassa Kalal.'

On 1765, Bhangi Misl Gujjar Singh Dhillon, Lehna singh, Sobha Singh Kanhaiya forced their way to Lahore, They recaptured  Lahore, The City divided into three, Lehna Singh who held the most important part of capital,  proved to be an able administrator, He was secular person, he joined Muslim in thie festivals and offering at their shrines, A few month of Lehna Singh rule erased anti-sikh prejudice created by the Afghans and the biogated mullah's from the  minds of people

Sikh Empire 

During the 18th century, as Mughal power dwindled, Lahore was often invaded by Afghan armies and became a province of the Afghan Empire, governed by provincial rulers with their own court. mainly in the Punjab region.

On 7 July 1799, Ranjit Singh accompanied by his mother-in-law Sada Kaur captured Lahore. Ranjit Singh used the Hazuri Bagh, the enclosed garden next to the Mosque as his official royal court of audience.

Twelve Sikh misls joined into one to form a new empire and sovereign Sikh State ruled by Maharaja Ranjit Singh. Ranjit Singh was crowned on 12 April 1801 at Lahore. The 1740s were years of chaos, and the city had nine different governors between 1745 and 1756. During this period Sikhs and Afghans fought battle against each other which is known as Afghan-Sikh wars, Sikhs able to capture whole Panjab region including Jammu, In 1801, Maharaja Ranjit Singh Established Sikh Empire. He defeated the grandson of Abdali, Zaman Shah in a battle between Lahore and Amritsar. Out of the chaos of Afghan and Sikh conflicts Ranjit Singh who was able to unify the Sikh factions and capture Lahore where he was crowned Emperor. 

Syed Ahmad Barelvi in Balakot, Mansehra District on 6 May 1831. Barelvi declared jihad against the Sikhs and established a camp in Balakot. Along with Shah Ismail Dehlvi and his tribesmen, he attacked the Sikhs at dawn. The battle lasted all day. The Sikh soldiers eventually beheaded Syed Ahmad Barelvi, and hundreds of his followers were killed causing the Muslim army to flee the battlefield.

Ranjit Singh's died on 27 June 1839 ultimately ended his reign, while the Sikh rule continued until the British gained control of the empire in 1849.

In 1841, during the Sikh civil war, Ranjit Singh's son, Sher Singh, used the Badshahi Mosque's large minarets for placement of zamburahs or light guns, which were placed atop the minarets of Badshahi Mosque to bombard the supporters of the Sikh Maharani Chand Kaur taking refuge in the besieged Lahore Fort, inflicting great damage to the Fort itself. In one of these bombardments, the Fort's Diwan-e-Aam (Hall of Public Audience) was destroyed (it was subsequently rebuilt by the British but never regained its original architectural splendour). During this time, Henri De la Rouche, a French cavalry officer employed in the army of Sher Singh, used a tunnel connecting the Badshahi Mosque to the Lahore Fort to temporarily store gunpowder.

Modern era

British Raj 

Maharajah Ranjit Singh made Lahore his capital and was able to expand the kingdom to the Khyber Pass and also included Jammu and Kashmir, while keeping the British from expanding across the River Sutlej for more than 40 years. Instability following his death in 1839 contributed to a series of adverse events that led eventually to British control of the Lahore Darbar ten years later. These precipitating factors were the internecine fighting between the Sikhs; several rapid forfeitures of territory by his sons; the intrigues of the Dogras; and two Anglo-Sikh wars, the first in 1845–1846 and the second, of 1848-1849. Capitalising on the disarray surrounding the succession struggles after Ranjit Singh's death and only partially diminished by a war fought against the Sikhs on their eastern frontier, the British rode into Lahore in February 1846 and garrisoned their troops in the citadel. Two unstable years later, they were drawn into a second war with the Sikhs at the southern city of Multan when that city's governor, Mul Raj, encouraged his troops to rebel. After a series of closely fought battles, the Sikh army was finally defeated in the Battle of Gujrat, sixty miles north of Lahore. In March 1848, following the British victory, Dalip Singh, Ranjit Singh's teenage son and heir to the throne, was formally deposed in Lahore. The remaining Sikh regiments in the city were abruptly decommissioned and camped outside the city demanding severance pay. Within a year, the Punjab was formally annexed to the British Empire and military sappers had begun leveling Lahore's city wall.

 
Under British rule (1849–1947), colonial architecture in Lahore combined Mughal, Gothic and Victorian styles. The General Post Office (GPO) and YMCA buildings in Lahore commemorated the golden jubilee of Queen Victoria, an event marked by the construction of clock towers and monuments all over India. Other important British  buildings included the High Court, the Government College University, the museums, the National College of Arts, Montgomery Hall, Tollinton Market, the University of the Punjab (Old Campus) and the Provincial Assembly.
Under British rule, Sir Ganga Ram (sometimes referred to as the father of modern Lahore) designed and built the General Post Office, Lahore Museum, Aitchison College, Mayo School of Arts (now the NCA), Ganga Ram Hospital, Lady Mclagan Girls High School, the chemistry department of the Government College University, the Albert Victor wing of Mayo Hospital, Sir Ganga Ram High School (now Lahore College for Women) the Hailey College of Commerce, Ravi Road House for the Disabled, the Ganga Ram Trust Building on Shahrah-e-Quaid-e-Azam, and the Lady Maynard Industrial School. He also constructed Model Town, a suburb that has recently developed into a cultural center for Lahore's growing socioeconomic elite.

The city has built a new campus in quieter environments on the Canal Bank, but the old university buildings are still functioning. For the sake of entertainment, the British introduced horse-racing to Lahore. The first racing club, established in 1924, is called LRC or Lahore Race Club.

Role in Independence 

Lahore enjoys a special position in the history of Pakistan Movement and Indian Independence Movement. The 1929 Congress session was held at Lahore. In this Congress, a resolution of "complete independence" was moved by Pandit Nehru and passed unanimously at midnight on 31 December 1929. On this occasion, the contemporary tricolor of India (with a chakra at its centre) was hoisted as a national flag, and thousands of people saluted it.

Lahore prison was a place to detain revolutionary freedom fighters. Noted freedom fighter Jatin Das died in Lahore prison after fasting for 63 days in protest of British treatment of political prisoners. One of the martyrs in the struggle for Indian independence, Shaheed Sardar Bhagat Singh, was hanged in Lahore Jail.

The most important session of the All India Muslim League, later the Pakistan Muslim League, the premier party fighting for Indian independence and the creation of Pakistan, was held in Lahore in 1940. Muslims under the leadership of Quaid-e-Azam demanded a separate homeland for Muslims of India in a document known as the Pakistan Resolution or the Lahore Resolution. During this session, Muhammad Ali Jinnah, leader of the league, publicly proposed the Two Nation Theory for the first time.

The predominantly Muslim population supported Muslim League and Pakistan Movement.  After the independence of Pakistan in 1947, the minority Hindus and Sikhs migrated to India while the Muslim refugees from India settled in the Lahore District.

Post-independence till present 
Lahore is regarded as the heart of Pakistan and is now the capital of the Punjab province in the state of Pakistan. Almost immediately after the independence, large scale riots broke out among Muslims, Sikhs and Hindus, causing many deaths as well as damage to historic monuments—including the Lahore Fort, Badshahi Mosque and other colonial buildings. With United Nations assistance, the government was able to rebuild Lahore, and most scars of the communal violence of independence were erased. Less than 20 years later, however, Lahore once again became a battleground in the War of 1965. The battlefield and trenches can still be observed today close to the Wagah border area.

After independence, Lahore was eclipsed by Karachi, which quickly became the biggest and most industrialized city. It was not until the administration of Mian brothers, and the 1990s riots in Karachi that Lahore once again gained its significance as an economic and cultural powerhouse through government reforms. The second Islamic Summit Conference was held in the city. In 1996, the International Cricket Council Cricket World Cup final match was held at the Gaddafi Stadium in Lahore.

The Walled City of Lahore known locally as the "Un-droone Shehr" (Inner City) is the oldest and most historic part of Lahore. The Punjab government embarked on a major project in 2009 to restore the Royal Trail (Shahi Guzar Gah) from Akbari Gate to the Lahore Fort with the help of the World Bank under the Sustainable Development of the Walled City of Lahore (SDWCL) project. The project aims at the Walled City development, at exploring and highlighting economic potential of the Walled City as a cultural heritage, exploring and highlighting the benefits of the SWDCL project for the residents, and at soliciting suggestions regarding maintenance of development and conservation of the Walled City.

The present day Lahore is a three-in-one city. That is why, when one visits Lahore; he finds three different cities – each distinguished from other in one way or other. The old city – existed for at least a thousand years – developed in and around circular road. Similarly, the British built Lahore covers the area from Mayo Hospital to the Canal Bank on the east. Unquestionably, third Lahore which includes various posh localities such as Gulberg, Bahria Town Joher town, Defence Housing Authority along with several others developed after the independence. Samnabad is a major residential area and administrative subdivision of Lahore, Pakistan. It is the one of Oldest Posh areas of Lahore and located in the center of City.

See also 
 Timeline of Lahore history

References

Bibliography 
Famous city of Pakistan

External links 

 
Lahore
Lahore
Lahore
Ancient history of Pakistan